The 2009 New York Jets season was the franchise's 40th season in the National Football League (NFL), the 50th season overall, the last season at Giants Stadium and the first under new head coach Rex Ryan. While they matched their 9–7 record from 2008, this time the team headed to the playoffs. The Jets fired head coach Eric Mangini on December 29, 2008 and hired Rex Ryan from the Baltimore Ravens on January 18, 2009. The Jets were represented at the 2010 Pro Bowl by Darrelle Revis, Nick Mangold, Shaun Ellis, D’Brickashaw Ferguson, and Alan Faneca.

One highlight from this season included the Jets snapping their former divisional rival Indianapolis Colts' NFL record 23-game regular season winning streak that dated back to October 27, 2008, in which they were beaten by their divisional rival Tennessee Titans, and the Jets also made their first AFC Championship Game appearance since 1998. Quarterback Mark Sanchez became one of two quarterbacks (the other being Joe Flacco of the Baltimore Ravens) since the 1970 AFL-NFL Merger to win multiple playoff games in their rookie season.

Offseason

Coaching changes

Head coach Eric Mangini was fired by the Jets on December 29, 2008. The decision was made after the Jets fell from 8–3 and sole possession of first place in the AFC East with four losses in their last five games, causing them to miss a playoff berth. He finished his tenure as head coach with a 23–25 record including the playoffs.

At first, the Jets attempted to lure former Pittsburgh Steelers head coach Bill Cowher out of retirement, with the possibility of Cowher gaining personnel decisions in addition to coaching. Cowher ultimately decided to stay retired in 2009. The Jets interviewed several candidates for their vacancy. In-house candidates included offensive coordinator Brian Schottenheimer and offensive line coach Bill Callahan. Other candidates interviewed were Indianapolis Colts defensive coordinator Ron Meeks, New York Giants defensive coordinator Steve Spagnuolo, and Boston College head coach Jeff Jagodzinski (who was subsequently fired from his position as a result of accepting the interview).

The Jets eventually picked Baltimore Ravens defensive coordinator Rex Ryan as their head coach. He accepted the position just hours after the Ravens' loss in the AFC Championship Game on January 18, and was introduced by the Jets on January 21.

Signings
On February 27, the Jets signed former Baltimore Ravens linebacker Bart Scott to a six-year, $48 million deal. On March 3, the Jets inked Jim Leonhard, former Ravens safety, to a three-year, $6 million deal.

Departures
After failing to come to terms on a contract extension, the Jets restructured the contract of wide receiver Laveranues Coles to allow him to immediately become an unrestricted free agent on February 25. Though Coles admitted a chance he could re-sign with the Jets, he signed a four-year deal with the Cincinnati Bengals. On March 4, former kicker Mike Nugent was signed by the Tampa Bay Buccaneers to a one-year deal.

Trades
On February 28, the Jets traded for cornerback Lito Sheppard of the Philadelphia Eagles, sending the Eagles a 2009 fifth-round draft pick and a 2010 conditional draft pick. The pick can be as high as second and as low as fourth. Upon the trade, Sheppard received a four-year, $27.2 million contract extension.

On October 7, the Jets made a blockbuster deal with the Cleveland Browns to send wide receiver Braylon Edwards to the Jets for wide receiver Chansi Stuckey, linebacker Jason Trusnik, and two draft picks.

2009 NFL draft

The Jets were assigned the 17th selection in the first round of the 2009 NFL Draft. Prior to the 2008 season, the Jets traded a conditional fourth round selection to the Green Bay Packers in exchange for quarterback Brett Favre; this became a third round selection because Favre took the majority of snaps for the Jets in 2008. They gave their fifth round pick to the Philadelphia Eagles in the Lito Sheppard trade. They also received a third round selection from the New Orleans Saints in exchange for linebacker Jonathan Vilma. Prior to the 2007 season, the Jets received a fourth round selection from the Washington Redskins in exchange for guard Pete Kendall; the pick was originally a 2008 fifth round selection that was upgraded due to Kendall's playing time in 2007.

On draft day, the Jets traded their first and second-round picks, defensive end Kenyon Coleman, safety Abram Elam, and quarterback Brett Ratliff to the Cleveland Browns for their first round selection, the fifth overall. The Jets used the selection to draft quarterback Mark Sanchez from the University of Southern California. The Jets also sent their third, fourth, and seventh-round selections to the Detroit Lions for the Lions' third-round pick, which was the first of the second day of the draft. The Jets selected running back Shonn Greene of the University of Iowa with this pick.

Staff

Rosters

Opening training camp roster

Week 1 roster

Final roster

Schedule

Preseason

Regular season

Note: Intra-division opponents are in bold text.

Standings

Game summaries

Week 1: at Houston Texans

The Jets began their season at Reliant Stadium for a Week 1 showdown with the Houston Texans. The Jets took off in the first quarter as kicker Jay Feely nailed a 24-yard field goal. In the second quarter, the Jets would increase their lead as rookie quarterback Mark Sanchez completed his first career touchdown pass as he connected with wide receiver Chansi Stuckey on a 30-yard pass. In the third quarter, the Jets continued their run as running back Thomas Jones got a 1-yard touchdown run. The Texans tried to rally in the fourth quarter as safety Dominique Barber returned a fumble 48 yards for a touchdown, but the Jets would end the game with Jones getting a 38-yard touchdown run.

With the win, not only did the Jets begin their season at 1–0, but Sanchez (18-of-31, 272 yards, 1 TD, 1 INT) would become the first Jets rookie QB since Richard Todd in 1976 to win a game.

Week 2: vs. New England Patriots

Coming off an impressive road win over the Texans, the Jets played their Week 2 home opener against their AFC East rival, the New England Patriots. In the week prior to the game, first-year Jets head coach Rex Ryan placed a phone message to all Jets season ticket holders asking them to "make it miserable for (Tom) Brady and company," following up on his comments during the off-season that he would not "kiss Bill Belichick's Super Bowl rings." He told the Jets fans that "the Patriots had a better head coach and a better quarterback," but that the game would decide "who has a better team." Meanwhile, Jets safety Kerry Rhodes said the Jets intended on not just winning, but "embarrassing" the Patriots in the game, while nose tackle Kris Jenkins called it the Jets' version of the Super Bowl; the Jets had not defeated the Patriots at home since 2000.
On the first drive of the game, without an injured Wes Welker, the Patriots drove to the Jets' 36-yard line before having to punt. The Jets' first play from scrimmage was a strip-sack of rookie quarterback Mark Sanchez by defensive lineman Mike Wright; Sanchez recovered the fumble at the Jets' 3-yard line. On 4th-and-24, the Jets punted back to their own 49-yard line; the Patriots could not capitalize on the field position and went three-and-out. However, Jets running back Leon Washington fumbled on the next play; cornerback Leigh Bodden recovered it at the Jets' 17-yard line. Two holding penalties would push the Patriots back to the Jets' 37-yard line, setting up a 45-yard Stephen Gostkowski field goal to give the Patriots a 3–0 lead. Following a Jets three-and-out, the Patriots moved to their own 41-yard line before Jets cornerback Darrelle Revis intercepted a pass intended for Randy Moss at the Jets' 16-yard line. The Jets offense would continue to struggle, however, going three-and-out again to end the first quarter.
The Patriots began the second quarter with a 9-play, 53-yard drive, one that stalled at the Jets' 7-yard line; the Patriots settled for another Stephen Gostkowski field goal, extending their lead to 6–0. The Jets would pick up their initial first down of the game on their next possession, going 52 yards on 10 plays before a Jay Feely 33-yard field goal cut the Patriots' lead in half. Starting from their own 10-yard line after a holding penalty on Sam Aiken on the kickoff, the Patriots took nearly six minutes off the clock, reaching the Jets' 11-yard line before two incomplete passes by Brady prevented the Patriots scoring their first touchdown of the game. Instead, Gostkowski kicked his third field goal of the day to increase the Patriots' lead to 9–3 going into halftime. Receiving the opening kickoff of the second half due to their deferral of the opening coin toss, the Jets took the lead in barely a minute. Following a 43-yard kick return by Washington, Sanchez hit wide receiver Jerricho Cotchery for 45 yards and a play later connected with tight end Dustin Keller on a 9-yard touchdown pass. The 10–9 lead was the first for the Jets over the Patriots at home since 2001. After a Patriots three-and-out, punter Chris Hanson's 30-yard punt gave the Jets the ball at the Patriots' 45-yard line. From the Patriots' 6-yard line, Sanchez appeared to throw a touchdown pass to Chansi Stuckey, but the catch was overturned after the Patriots challenged. Two plays later, Feely hit his second field goal of the day to give the Jets a 13–9 lead.
The Patriots' ensuing possession reached the Jets' 35-yard line on a third down, but back-to-back delay of game penalties on Tom Brady, an incomplete pass, and a face-mask penalty on Moss on the punt backed the Patriots up to their own 40-yard line. However, Hanson's subsequent attempt was better than the first, nullified by the penalty, and the Jets began their next drive from their own 15-yard line. On a 14-play, 63-yard drive that spanned into the fourth quarter, the Jets extended their lead to 16–9 on a 39-yard Feely field goal. The Patriots started their next drive from their own 15-yard line as well, but were unable to reach midfield before punting. A Jets three-and-out gave the Patriots another opportunity with five minutes remaining, but a Ben Watson holding penalty in the middle of the drive helped set up a 2nd-and-20 situation and eventually another punt. Just before the two-minute warning, Sanchez was sacked, but a penalty on BenJarvus Green-Ellis on the ensuing punt meant the Patriots had to start their last drive of the game from their own 10-yard line. After a Julian Edelman 18-yard reception began it, four straight in-completions ended the drive and the game. With the win, not only did the Jets improve to 2–0, but it also marked the first time that they defeated the Patriots at home since 2000. This also marked the first time that New England was held without a touchdown since December 10, 2006.
Rex Ryan would become the first Jets rookie head coach since Al Groh to win their first two games.

Week 3: vs. Tennessee Titans

The Jets wore New York Titans throwback uniforms for an AFL Legacy Game with the Tennessee Titans, who wore 1960s Houston Oilers uniforms. The game was originally scheduled for a 4:15 PM start time but due to the Jewish holiday at sundown, Woody Johnson wrote a letter to the NFL asking to move the game to a 1:00 PM start time so more people could attend the game.

The Jets would take flight in the first quarter with rookie quarterback Mark Sanchez getting a 14-yard touchdown run. And later in the first he completed a 2-yard touchdown pass to tight end Ben Hartsock. The Titans would answer in the second quarter with running back LenDale White's 5-yard touchdown run and kicker Rob Bironas' 38-yard field goal. This made the score 14–10 with the Jets leading.

Tennessee would take the lead in the third quarter with quarterback Kerry Collins' 9-yard touchdown pass to wide receiver Nate Washington, yet the Jets came right back with Sanchez's 6-yard touchdown pass to wide receiver Jerricho Cotchery. In the fourth quarter, the Jets would add onto their lead with a 30-yard field goal from kicker Jay Feely. Afterwards, the defense would prevent any possible comeback attempts from the Titans.

With the win, not only did the Jets improve to 3–0, but Sanchez (17-of-30, 171 yards, 2 TDs, 1 INT) would become the first rookie quarterback since the AFL–NFL merger of 1970 to win their first three games. Also, this marked the first time since 2004 that the Jets started a season at 3–0.

Week 4: at New Orleans Saints

Coming off their home win over the Titans, the Jets flew to the Louisiana Superdome for a Week 4 interconference duel with the New Orleans Saints. The Jets would find themselves struggling early with Saints kicker John Carney making a 34-yard field goal. New Orleans would take command in the second quarter with safety Darren Sharper returning an interception 99 yards for a touchdown, followed by rookie quarterback Mark Sanchez fumbling the ball in his own endzone (due to a sack by defensive end Will Smith), which was recovered by defensive tackle Remi Ayodele for a touchdown. The Jets would close out the half with a 38-yard field goal from kicker Jay Feely.

The Jets tried to make a comeback run as running back Thomas Jones got a 15-yard touchdown run in the third quarter, but the Saints sealed the victory with running back Pierre Thomas' 1-yard touchdown run and a stiff defensive effort.

With the loss, the Jets fell to 3–1.

Week 5: at Miami Dolphins

Hoping to rebound from their road loss to the Saints, the Jets flew to Land Shark Stadium for a Week 5 Monday Night duel with their AFC East rival, the Miami Dolphins. The Jets immediately trailed as the Dolphins took the game's opening drive and capped it off with a 1-yard touchdown run from running Ronnie Brown. The Jets immediately responded with rookie quarterback Mark Sanchez completing a 3-yard touchdown pass to newly acquired wide receiver Braylon Edwards. Afterwards, Miami closed out the opening quarter with a 35-yard field goal from kicker Dan Carpenter. In the second quarter, the Jets took the lead as kicker Jay Feely got a 40-yard and a 43-yard field goal.

After a scoreless third quarter, both the Jets and the Dolphins would get involved in a back-and-forth fourth quarter. Miami opened up the period with quarterback Chad Henne hooking up with tight end Anthony Fasano on a 2-yard touchdown pass, while the Jets got a 1-yard touchdown run from running back Thomas Jones. The Dolphins would immediately respond as Henne threw a 53-yard touchdown pass to wide receiver Ted Ginn Jr., but Jones came through again with a 3-yard touchdown run. Late in the game, Miami managed to crack through the Jets' defense as Brown got a 2-yard touchdown run. The Jets tried to rally, but Sanchez's last-second Hail Mary pass was knocked away.

With the loss, the Jets fell to 3–2.

Week 6: vs. Buffalo Bills

Hoping to snap a two-game losing streak, the Jets went home for a Week 6 AFC East duel with the Buffalo Bills. Both teams began the first quarter with field goals, as Bills kicker Rian Lindell made a 33-yard field goal and Jets kicker Jay Feely hit a 23-yard field goal. In the second quarter, the Jets soared into the lead with Feely's 41-yard field goal and running back Thomas Jones' 71-yard touchdown run. However, Buffalo rallied to tie the game in the third quarter with Lindell's 25-yard field goal and quarterback Ryan Fitzpatrick's 37-yard touchdown pass to wide receiver Lee Evans. After both teams failed to get any point in the fourth quarter, the game went into overtime. Despite getting the ball to start off OT, the Jets failed to get any point out of their opening drive. After a hard-fought period, the Bills would emerge on top as Lindell booted the game-winning 47-yard field goal.

With the loss, the Jets fell to 3–3.

Thomas Jones would have a career day as he ran 22 times for a franchise-best 210 yards (in addition to his rushing touchdown).

Week 7: at Oakland Raiders

Hoping to snap a three-game losing streak, the Jets flew to the Oakland–Alameda County Coliseum, donned their throwbacks, and played a Week 7 AFL Legacy game with the Oakland Raiders. The Jets took flight in the first quarter with a 1-yard touchdown run from running back Thomas Jones and a 3-yard touchdown run from rookie quarterback Mark Sanchez. They would increase their lead in the second quarter with rookie running back Shonn Greene getting an 8-yard touchdown run, followed by kicker Jay Feely booting a 39-yard field goal. Afterwards, the Jets would pull away with Sanchez's 35-yard touchdown pass to wide receiver David Clowney in the third quarter and Greene's 33-yard touchdown run in the fourth.

With the win, the Jets improved to 4–3.

Week 8: vs. Miami Dolphins

Coming off their shutout road win over the Raiders, the Jets went home, donned their white New York Titans uniforms again, and played a Week 8 divisional rematch with the Miami Dolphins. After a scoreless first quarter, the teams exchanged field goals, with Jets kicker Jay Feely making a 23-yard field goal, followed by Dolphins kicker Dan Carpenter getting a 48-yard field goal.

In a back-and-forth third quarter, the Jets began the scoring with Feely making a 55-yard field goal. Miami immediately answered with wide receiver Ted Ginn Jr. returning a kickoff 100 yards for a touchdown, followed by linebacker Jason Taylor returning a fumble 48 yards for a touchdown. The Jets replied with rookie quarterback Mark Sanchez getting a 1-yard touchdown run, but the Dolphins came back as Ginn Jr. returned a kickoff 101 yards for a touchdown. The Jets then closed out the period with Sanchez hooking up with wide receiver Braylon Edwards on a 19-yard touchdown pass (with a failed two-point conversion). In the fourth quarter, Miami struck again as quarterback Chad Henne found tight end Joey Haynos on a 5-yard touchdown pass (with a failed two-point conversion). The Jets tried to rally as Sanchez completed a 16-yard touchdown pass to tight end Dustin Keller (with another two-point conversion), but New York's rally fell short.

With the loss, the Jets went into their bye week at 4–4.

Week 10: vs. Jacksonville Jaguars

Coming off their bye week, the Jets stayed at home for a Week 10 duel with the Jacksonville Jaguars. The Jets would trail early in the first quarter with running back Maurice Jones-Drew's 33-yard touchdown run, but would respond with kicker Jay Feely getting a 32-yard field goal, followed by rookie quarterback Mark Sanchez completing a 7-yard touchdown pass to wide receiver Jerricho Cotchery. In the second quarter, Jacksonville would take the lead as quarterback David Garrard got an 11-yard touchdown run and completed a 26-yard touchdown pass to wide receiver Mike Sims-Walker. The Jets would close out the half with Feely making a 37-yard field goal.

After a scoreless third quarter, the Jets would regain the lead in the fourth quarter with a 40-yard field goal from Feely and a 1-yard touchdown run from running back Thomas Jones (with a failed 2-point conversion). However, the Jaguars got the last laugh as kicker Josh Scobee booted the game-winning 21-yard field goal.

With the loss, the Jets fell to 4–5.

Week 11: at New England Patriots

Trying to avoid three straight losses, the Jets flew to Gillette Stadium for a Week 11 AFC East rematch with the New England Patriots. In the first quarter, the Jets struggled early on both sides of the ball as Patriots cornerback Leigh Bodden returned an interception 53 yards for a touchdown, followed by quarterback Tom Brady completing a 4-yard touchdown pass to wide receiver Randy Moss. In the second quarter, the Jets continued to trail as running back Laurence Maroney got a 2-yard touchdown run, while kicker Stephen Gostkowski made a 26-yard field goal. The Jets would close out the half with wide receiver Brad Smith returning a blocked punt 4 yards for a touchdown.

In the third quarter, the Jets tried to come back as quarterback Mark Sanchez threw a 29-yard touchdown pass to wide receiver Jerricho Cotchery, but New England would pull away in the fourth quarter with Maroney's 1-yard touchdown run.

With the loss, the Jets fell to 4–6.

Week 12: vs. Carolina Panthers

Trying to snap a three-game losing streak, the Jets went home for a Week 12 interconference duel with the Carolina Panthers. The Jets would take off in the first quarter as cornerback Darrelle Revis returned an interception 67 yards for a touchdown. The Panthers would get on the board as kicker John Kasay made a 40-yard field goal, yet the Jets would answer with a 3-yard touchdown run from running back Thomas Jones. After a scoreless third quarter, Carolina tried to rally in the fourth quarter with Kasay nailing a 28-yard field goal. Afterwards, the Jets would pull away as kicker Jay Feely booted a 47-yard field goal.

With the win, the Jets improved to 5–6.

Week 13: at Buffalo Bills

Thomas Jones and Shonn Greene combined for 168 yards rushing, as the Jets compiled 249 total yards on the ground to top the Buffalo Bills, 19–13, at Rogers Centre. Mark Sanchez passed for 104 yards and a score on 7-of-15 passing before injuring his right knee on a head- first dive in the third quarter. Braylon Edwards had three catches for 45 yards and a score, while Jerricho Cotchery had four receptions for 68 yards in the win. Ryan Fitzpatrick struggled to complete passes, throwing for just 98 yards and an interception on 9-of-23 efficiency for the Bills, who have lost four of five to effectively end any slim playoff hopes the team had. Marshawn Lynch ran six times for 60 yards and a touchdown, while Fred Jackson had 13 rushes for 31 yards.

With the win, the Jets improved to 6–6.

Week 14: at Tampa Bay Buccaneers

The Jets would blow out the Buccaneers and improve to 7-6 getting right in the thick of the playoff race.

Week 15: vs. Atlanta Falcons

The Jets had a 7–3 lead from the end of the 1st quarter to the middle of the 4th quarter until Matt Ryan connected with Tony Gonzalez giving the Falcons a 10–7 lead that would seal the game. With the loss, the Jets fell to 7-7 needing to win their last two game in order to be even considered a playoff contender.

Week 16: at Indianapolis Colts

With the win, the Jets ended the Colts' perfect season run, and also ended their 23–game regular season winning streak. The Jets were able to capitalize on the Colts' decision to bench quarterback Peyton Manning to avoid injury given they had already made the playoffs. The Jets improved their playoff chances greatly by moving to 8–7 on the season. Having beaten the 10–0 Titans the previous season, the Jets thus became the first NFL team to beat the final undefeated team in consecutive seasons since the 1960 and 1961 St. Louis Cardinals.

Week 17: vs. Cincinnati Bengals

The Jets would need to win the season finale to get in the playoffs. They did just that as they flew right past the Bengals 37-0 and they would meet in a rematch in Cincinnati for the Wild Card Round. The Jets would finish 9-7 this time however getting them a playoff berth unlike last year. This was also the last game played at Giants Stadium.

Postseason

Schedule

Game summaries

AFC Wild Card Playoffs: at (4) Cincinnati Bengals

Entering the playoffs as the AFC's No. 5 seed, the Jets began their playoff run at Paul Brown Stadium in the AFC Wild Card game against the No. 4 Cincinnati Bengals, in a rematch of their dominating Week 17 game.

The Jets would trail in the first quarter as Bengals quarterback Carson Palmer completed an 11-yard touchdown pass to former Jets wide receiver Laveranues Coles, but responded in the second quarter with a 39-yard touchdown run from rookie running back Shonn Greene, followed by rookie quarterback Mark Sanchez hooking up with tight end Dustin Keller on a 45-yard touchdown pass.

The Jets would add onto their lead in the third quarter with a 9-yard touchdown run from running back Thomas Jones. Cincinnati would begin to rally in the fourth quarter as running back Cedric Benson got a 47-yard touchdown run, but the Jets came right back as kicker Jay Feely nailed a 20-yard field goal.

With the win, not only did the Jets improve their overall record to 10–7, but rookie quarterback Mark Sanchez and rookie head coach Rex Ryan picked up their first postseason win.

AFC Divisional Playoffs: at (2) San Diego Chargers

Coming off their impressive road win over the Bengals, the Jets flew to Qualcomm Stadium for the AFC Divisional Round against the No. 2 San Diego Chargers. After a scoreless first quarter, the Jets would trail in the second quarter as Chargers quarterback Philip Rivers completed a 13-yard touchdown pass to fullback Kris Wilson. The Jets would answer in the third quarter with kicker Jay Feely making a 46-yard field goal, and then take the lead in the fourth quarter as rookie quarterback Mark Sanchez completed a 2-yard touchdown to tight end Dustin Keller, followed by rookie running back Shonn Greene busting for a 53-yard touchdown run. San Diego tried to rally as quarterback Philip Rivers ran in for a 1-yard touchdown run, yet the Jets recovered the onside kick for the win.

With the win, not only did the Jets improve their overall record to 11–7, but they advanced to their first AFC Championship Game since 1998. They also won consecutive playoff games for the first time since 1982.

Sanchez (12 of 23 for 100 yards with 1 TD and 1 INT) would join Ravens' quarterback Joe Flacco as the only rookie quarterbacks in NFL history to win two playoff games.

AFC Championship: at (1) Indianapolis Colts

Coming off their divisional road win over the Chargers, the Jets flew to Lucas Oil Stadium for the AFC Championship Game against the top-seeded Indianapolis Colts. After a scoreless first quarter, the Jets would trail to begin the second quarter as Colts kicker Matt Stover made a 25-yard field goal. The Jets would immediately respond as rookie quarterback Mark Sanchez hooked up with wide receiver Braylon Edwards on an 80-yard touchdown pass. Indianapolis would chip away at New York's lead as Stover got a 19-yard field goal, yet the Jets struck again with Sanchez finding tight end Dustin Keller on a 9-yard touchdown pass, followed by kicker Jay Feely's 48-yard field goal. However, the Colts continued their assault as quarterback Peyton Manning completed a 9-yard touchdown pass to wide receiver Austin Collie.

Indianapolis would take the lead in the third quarter with Manning completing a 4-yard touchdown pass to wide receiver Pierre Garçon, followed by Manning's 15-yard touchdown pass to tight end Dallas Clark in the fourth quarter. Afterwards, the Colts would pull away as Stover booted a 21-yard field goal.

With the loss, New York's season would come to an end with an overall record of 11–8. The Jets failed to go to the Super Bowl and their wait for their second appearance and first since 1968 continues as of 2021.

References

External links

2009 New York Jets season at Pro Football Reference
2009 New York Jets season at ESPN

New York Jets seasons
New York Jets
New York Jets season
21st century in East Rutherford, New Jersey
Meadowlands Sports Complex